Napaporn Charanawat (born 29 March 1999) is a Thai taekwondo practitioner. 

She won a bronze medal in finweight at the 2017 World Taekwondo Championships. She won a bronze medal at the 2016 Asian Taekwondo Championships, and a silver medal at the 2018 Asian Taekwondo Championships.

References

1999 births
Living people
Napaporn Charanawat
World Taekwondo Championships medalists
Asian Taekwondo Championships medalists
Napaporn Charanawat